Sirius Passet is a Cambrian Lagerstätte in Peary Land, Greenland. The Sirius Passet Lagerstätte was named after the Sirius sledge patrol that operates in North Greenland. It comprises six places in Nansen Land, on the east shore of J.P. Koch Fjord in the far north of Greenland. It was discovered in 1984 by A. Higgins of the Geological Survey of Greenland. A preliminary account was published by Simon Conway Morris and others in 1987 and expeditions led by J. S. Peel and Conway Morris have returned to the site several times between 1989 and the present. A field collection of perhaps 10,000 fossil specimens has been amassed. It is a part of the Buen Formation.

Age 

Preservation 
The preservation of the Sirius Passet is traditionally considered to represent silicification associated with a death mask, recalling the 'Ediacara-type' preservation of the Precambrian Ediacara biota. A 2022 study suggested that the original preservation mode was phosphatisation that was later altered by low-grade metamorphism with a peak temperature of  during the Devonian Ellesmerian orogeny, which resulted in widespread mineral replacement.

Geochemical analysis indicates that the fossils lived close to the boundary of an oxygen minimum zone, possibly being preserved in oxygen-starved periods.

IUGS geological heritage site
In respect of the importance of the exceptionally preserved fossils in our understanding of the event, the 'Cambrian Explosion in Sirius Passet' was included by the International Union of Geological Sciences (IUGS) in its assemblage of 100 'geological heritage sites' around the world in a listing published in October 2022. The organisation defines an 'IUGS Geological Heritage Site' as 'a key place with geological elements and/or processes of international scientific relevance, used as a reference, and/or with a substantial contribution to the development of geological sciences through history.'

Fauna 
Although the fauna has not yet been fully described, it is known to consist of a moderate number of arthropods and sponges, and rare representatives of other groups.  It has yielded the problematic taxon Halkieria, and the Panarthropods Kerygmachela and Pambdelurion, all of which have played prominent roles in discussions about the origins of the modern animal phyla.

Taxa from the Sirius Passet fauna 
After

Arthropods

Other animals

See also
Matground

References

Further reading

External links 
 Palaeos.com: Cambrian Sirius Passet

Geologic formations of Greenland
Cambrian Greenland
Cambrian paleontological sites
Paleontology in Greenland
Lagerstätten

Peary Land
First 100 IUGS Geological Heritage Sites